Tonawanda Engine is a General Motors engine factory in Buffalo, New York. The plant consists of three facilities totaling  and sits upon . The factory receives cast engine blocks from Defiance Foundry in Defiance, Ohio and Saginaw Metal Casting Operations in Saginaw, Michigan, and received engine block castings and cylinder heads from the former Massena Castings Plant in Massena, New York.

History
The campus houses three different engine plants. Plant #1, located at 2995 River Road in Buffalo, was built in 1938; Plant #4, located at 2390 Kenmore Avenue, was built in 1941; and Plant #5, located at 240 Vulcan Street, was built in 2001.

Investments
 2010 $425 million for the next Generation Ecotec 2.0:/2.5L
 2010 $400 million for a new V8 small block engine

Products
 Ecotec GenIII 
 2.0L Turbo
 2.5L
 Small-Block Engine Gen V
 4.3L
 5.3L
 6.2L
 6.2L LT1 & LT4

Total engines produced since 1938 – 70,967,249

Product Applications
 Ecotec GenIII
 Buick:  Regal
 Cadillac: ATS and CTS
 Chevrolet: Malibu, Impala, and Camaro
 Opel:  Insignia
 Small Block GenV
 Chevrolet: Silverado
 GMC: Sierra
 LT1 & LT4
 Chevrolet: Corvette, Camaro

Awards
 Ward's Best Engines 2014 - 6.2L LT1 Small Block GenV
 Ward's Best Engines 2013 - 2.0L Turbo Ecotec GenII
 Ken-Ton Chamber of Commerce Green Globe Award for being a leader in Green Manufacturing, 2013
 EPA ENERGY STAR Challenge for Industry Recipient, 2010
 Certificate of Appreciation from WNY Chapter 77 Vietnam Veterans of American Chapter

Employee information
 Hourly: 1,498
 Salary: 237
 Union Local: UAW Local 774

See also
 List of GM factories

References

External links
General Motors: Tonawanda Engine

General Motors factories
1938 establishments in New York (state)
Motor vehicle assembly plants in New York (state)
Economy of Buffalo, New York
Industrial buildings completed in 1938